Jose Luis Olivas Martinez (born 13 October 1952 in Motilla del Palancar, Cuenca) is a Spanish politician of the People's Party. He was named the third president of the Valencian Government (the first not to have been chosen in elections) when Eduardo Zaplana moved to Madrid in 2002. A year later he was replaced by Francisco Camps, who took over the leadership of the party in the Valencian Community. Olivas decided then to pursue a business career. In 2003 he was appointed president of Banco de Valencia, in 2004 president of Bancaja and in 2010 vice president of Bankia (a bank created by the merger of Caja Madrid, Bancaja and others).

Banco de Valencia went bankrupt in October 2011 and the State took over its control. Olivas resigned. In December 2011 Bankia declared enormous losses and the government nationalized the entity and imposed a new direction. In May 2012 he resigned as president of Bancaja.

On 29 June 2015, the Unidad Central Operativa, the serious crime division of Spain's Guardia Civil arrested Olivas on charges of embezzlement and fraud.

References

1952 births
Living people
Presidents of the Valencian Government
People from Cuenca, Spain
People's Party (Spain) politicians
Complutense University of Madrid alumni
Members of the 4th Corts Valencianes
Members of the 5th Corts Valencianes